Wundanyi Constituency is an electoral constituency in Kenya. It is one of four constituencies in Taita-Taveta County. The constituency has four wards, all represented in the Taita-Taveta County Assembly. The constituency was established for the 1963 elections.

Members of Parliament

Locations and wards

References 

Constituencies in Taita-Taveta County
Constituencies in Coast Province
1963 establishments in Kenya
Constituencies established in 1963